The Table tennis tournament is held since 2006.

Winners

Men's singles
2009:  Andre Silva
2006:  Ricardo Oliveira

Women's singles
2009:  Ligia Silvia
2006:  Mariany Nonaka

Men's doubles
2009: 
2006:  dos Santos/Efimov

Women's doubles
2009: 
2006:  Silvia/Nonaka

Mixed doubles
2006:  Kojima/Silvia

References

 
Table tennis
Lusophony Games